Kalaweldeniya is a village in Sri Lanka. It is located within the Central Province of Sri Lanka.

See also
List of towns in Central Province, Sri Lanka

External links

Populated places in Nuwara Eliya District